James Joseph Shinn (born October 22, 1951) is a technology entrepreneur, scholar, and former U.S. government official with a history in business, public service and foreign affairs. He appeared in broadcast and printed media discussing topics including international business, financial markets, and national security.

Education
Born in Mount Holly, New Jersey, Shinn earned his BA degree from Princeton University in 1973, followed by an MBA at Harvard in 1981. He returned to complete his PhD at Princeton in 2001.

Career

Business career 
Shinn worked as a second vice president at the Chase Manhattan Bank in 1974, in commercial lending, commodities, and foreign exchange, serving in New York, Tokyo and Hong Kong; Chase was acquired by J.P. Morgan in 2000.

Shinn began working in Silicon Valley at Advanced Micro Devices (AMD), a Sunnyvale, California-based semiconductor firm, including roles as product market engineer in the MOS Microprocessor Group, where he worked on the x86 architecture; district sales manager in New York/New Jersey; and then General Manager of Nihon AMD in Japan.

He then co-founded Dialogic, a telecommunications voice processing firm using digital signal processing (DSP)technology, with Nick Zwick, Ken Burkhardt, and Charles Walden, in 1983. Dialogic pioneered open-source voice processing and one of the first voice-over-IP (VOIP) algorithm protocols, at scale, in the 1980s. Dialogic did an IPO in 1992 and was acquired by Intel for $780m in 1999, becoming Intel's Media and Signaling division.

After Dialogic he was an investor and advisor to a series of technology start-up's, including Haystack Labs, a cyber security start-up founded by Steven Smaha in 1989, focused on UNIX-based intrusion detection systems, acquired by Trusted Information Systems in 1997; Longitude, a derivatives trading platform founded by Andrew Lawrence and Charles Walden in 1999, acquired by the ISE and Goldman Sachs in 2006; Modo Labs, an enterprise mobile engagement platform founded by Andrew Yu and a team from MIT in 2010; and Kenshō Financial, a fintech data analytics firm founded by Daniel Nadler and a team from Harvard in 2013, acquired by S&P Global for $550m in 2018.  Shinn co-founded Predata, a New York- and Washington-based data analytics firm with applications in national security and information operations, with Andrew Choi, Collin Stedman, Hill Wyrough, John Alfieri, and Joshua Haecker, in 2015. Predata was acquired by FiscalNote in 2021.

In financial markets, he co-founded Teneo Intelligence, a New York- and London-based geopolitical risk advisory group, with Kevin Kajiwara and Wolfango Piccoli, in 2012. He served as a non-executive director on the supervisory board of CQS, Ltd, a London-based multi-strategy hedge fund with $18bn assets under management (AUM), founded by Michael Hintze in 1999.

He was an investor and advisor to Red Six, a Maryland- and Washington DC-based firm specializing in unmanned aerial systems (UAS) threat analysis, emulation, and protection, co-founded by Scott Crino and Andy Dreby in 2012,; KMB Telematics, a software-controlled RADAR firm founded by Bryan Cattle, with applications in autonomous vehicles (AV) and counter-UAS(cUAS); SeekAI, a New York-based generative AI company, founded by Sarah Nagy; and OMX Ventures, an Illinois-based biotechnology venture capital firm, founded by Craig Asher. In 2021 he joined Criteo S.A. as a senior advisor on digital currency solutions, and in 2022 moved to Bitt, a provider of central bank digital currency (CBDC) platforms.

U.S. Government Career 
Shinn began government service as an economic analyst in the State Department's Bureau of East Asian and Pacific Affairs in 1977, serving under Assistant Secretary Richard Holbrooke, working primarily on U.S.-Japan economic relations, including industrial structure policy, and the Tokyo Round of the Multilateral Trade Negotiations (MTN).

In 2002-3 Shinn served as Public Delegate to the General Assembly of the United Nations. From 2003 until 2006, Shinn was the National Intelligence Officer (NIO) for East Asia at the Central Intelligence Agency and at the Office of the Director of National Intelligence (ODNI).   

In 2007 he was confirmed by the U.S. Senate as Assistant Secretary of Defense for Asia, serving under Secretary Robert Gates. At the Pentagon he worked primarily on policy problems related to the Peoples Republic of China; North Korea's nuclear program; and the U.S. security relationship with Japan, the Republic of Korea, India, Australia, Singapore, and Taiwan. http://english.hani.co.kr/arti/english_edition/e_national/280370.html He participated in policy-making with regard to the wars in Afghanistan and Pakistan, and was awarded the Distinguished Public Service medal.  

In 2020 Shinn rejoined the State Department as Senior Advisor to the Bureau for Economic Growth, Energy and the Environment, serving with Undersecretary Keith Krach, primarily working on technology policy vis-a-vis the PRC, including the Clean Network effort, on 5G telephony, semiconductors, cloud computing, applied machine learning, and electronic payments systems.

Academic career 

He was Senior Fellow for Asia at the Council on Foreign Relations from 1993 to 1996, where he authored several task force reports and books, including Riding the Tigers: American Commercial Diplomacy in Asia (1998), with Jeffrey Garten and Robert Zoellick; The Tests of War and the Strains of Peace: The U.S.-Japan Security Relationship (1998), with Harold Brown and Richard Armitage; Fires Across the Water: Transnational Problems in Asia (1998); and Weaving the Net: Conditional Engagement with China (1996). Weaving the Net was reviewed in Foreign Affairs magazine as “A well-reasoned argument for advancing American interests in Asia and a substantial contribution to the debate on China. The volume calls for ‘conditional engagement’ and identifies 10 guiding principles; for example, peaceful resolution of territorial disputes, freedom of navigation, and transparency of military forces.”

Later, in 2002, Shinn worked with Jan Lodal at the Council on Foreign Relations on "Red-Teaming the Data Gap" (2002). From the project's synopsis: “This paper outlines the information technology requirements of an effective Homeland Defense strategy against further al-Qaeda terror strikes within the United States….The paper describes how commercially available techniques from the private sector, including database merge-and-search methods now used in many Internet applications, can be deployed quickly and cheaply to plug the counter-terror gap.”

His other books include Afghan Peace Talks: A Primer (RAND Press, 2011), with James Dobbins, outlining the roadmap for a settlement of the War in Afghanistan; Political Power and Corporate Control: the New Global Politics of Corporate Governance (Princeton University Press, 2005), with Peter Gourevitch;  and "How Shareholder Reforms Can Pay Foreign Policy Dividends, also with Peter Gourevitch.

Afghan Peace Talks was described by Ambassador Zalmay Khalilzad, U.S. Special Representative for Afghanistan Reconciliation,  as “A thoughtful and timely contribution on an important issue by two knowledgeable analysts and experienced practitioners.” The Shinn-Dobbins book was based on the Century Foundation's Afghanistan: Negotiating Peace project, co-chaired by Thomas Pickering and Lakhdar Brahimi, during which the authors met with a spectrum of former and current Taliban leaders in Pakistan and Afghanistan, as well as senior officials in India, Iran, China, and Russia, in an effort to identify the contours of a viable political settlement to the War in Afghanistan, which at the time had been waged for over a decade since 9/11.

Political Power and Corporate Control was reviewed in Foreign Affairs magazine as “Gourevitch and Shinn conduct comparative analysis at its best, introducing cross-country quantitative analysis where that is possible and appropriate, but also offering analytical narratives on corporate governance, its likely origins, and the political and legal structures that support it in 13 countries (mostly in Asia and Europe, but also including Chile and the United States). They combine superb conceptual clarity with informative detail.” In 2021, he and Peter Gourevitch updated and extended their book's argument with new data on ownership compiled by the OECD in Chapter 11, "The Perplexing Roles of Institutional Investors in a World of Multiple Investing Entities," in The Emergence of Corporate Governance, edited by Knut Sogner and Andrea Colli (Routledge: International Studies in Business History).

He was Visiting Lecturer at Princeton University's School of Engineering and Applied Science from 2009 to 2016, where he taught a course technical innovation, EGR 492, “Radical Innovation in Global Markets.”

Philanthropy 
Shinn served on the advisory board of the Department of Ophthalmology at New York-Presbyterian Columbia University Medical Center, in gratitude for the science and skill of retinal surgeon Stanley Chang, MD; provided seed capital for the formation of Princeton's Scholars in the Nation's Service (SINSI) program; and as a donor to the Asia Foundation, for its programs empowering women in developing countries in Asia and the Library Company of Burlington – chartered by George II in 1758—where he learned to read.

References

External links

1951 births
Living people
People from Mount Holly, New Jersey
Princeton University alumni
Harvard Business School alumni
Walsh School of Foreign Service faculty
20th-century American businesspeople
20th-century American writers
Analysts of the Central Intelligence Agency
United States Assistant Secretaries of Defense